Korfball was introduced as a World Games sport at the 1985 World Games in London.

Medalists

Mixed

External links
 World Games at Sports123 by Internet Archive
 World Games 2013

 
1985 introductions
Sports at the World Games
World Games